Bavik-e Vosta (also Romanized as Bavīk-e Vosţá; also known as Bavīk and Bawīk) is a village in Shakhenat Rural District, in the Central District of Birjand County, South Khorasan Province, Iran. At the 2006 census, its population was 318, in 110 families.

References 

Populated places in Birjand County